Bienville may refer to:

People
Jean-Baptiste Le Moyne de Bienville (1680–1767), French colonial administrator in New France
Pierre Joseph Céloron de Blainville or Celeron de Bienville (1693–1759), French colonial explorer of the Ohio Valley

Places
Bienville, Louisiana, U.S.
Bienville Parish, Louisiana, U.S.
Bienville, Oise, France
Bienville National Forest in Mississippi, U.S.
 Lake Bienville, in Quebec, Canada

Other uses
 , an American Civil War paddle steamer 
 Bienville House, a hotel in New Orleans, Louisiana, U.S.
 Bienville University, a diploma mill in Baton Rouge, Louisiana, U.S.

See also